Orleans Historic District  is a national historic district located at Orleans, Orange County, Indiana.  The district encompasses 163 contributing buildings, 4 contributing sites, and 10 contributing objects in the central business district and surrounding residential sections of Orleans.  It developed between about 1837 and 1958, and includes notable examples of Italianate, Queen Anne, Second Empire, Gothic Revival, Colonial Revival, Classical Revival, Tudor Revival, and Bungalow / American Craftsman style architecture. Notable buildings include the Cornelius-Osborn Building (1927), Magner-Lindsey Hotel (1872, c. 1901, c. 1909), Roberts Building / Herle's Restaurant (c. 1901), Presbyterian Church (c. 1845), Methodist Episcopal Church (1915), Bowles Building (1889), Hollowell Brothers Building (1897-1898), Orleans Public Library (1915), and Ashland Service Station (1955).

It was listed on the National Register of Historic Places in 2009.

References

Historic districts on the National Register of Historic Places in Indiana
Queen Anne architecture in Indiana
Italianate architecture in Indiana
Second Empire architecture in Indiana
Gothic Revival architecture in Indiana
Colonial Revival architecture in Indiana
Tudor Revival architecture in Indiana
Neoclassical architecture in Indiana
Bungalow architecture in Indiana
Historic districts in Orange County, Indiana
National Register of Historic Places in Orange County, Indiana